The Commander Littoral Strike Group (COMLSG) is a senior British Royal Navy Amphibious warfare appointment. COMLSG, who is based in Stonehouse Barracks, Stonehouse, Plymouth, reports to Commander United Kingdom Strike Force. It was first established in 1971 as Commodore Amphibious Warfare. 

Today COMLSG is a deployable one-star Maritime Component Commander held at Very High Readiness (72 hours or less) in order to respond to unexpected global events. In most circumstances, COMLSG and his staff would deploy in the Fleet Flagship (such as HMS Albion, or one of the new Queen Elizabeth-class aircraft carriers) in order to command a deployed task group.  While structured and trained to conduct high intensity war-fighting (with an emphasis on amphibious operations, working alongside 3 Commando Brigade, the staff are capable of commanding a diverse range of activities such as evacuation operations, or disaster relief.

History
In the 1960s most of the Navy's amphibious capability was under Commodore, Amphibious Forces, Far East Fleet (COMAFFEF), based at Singapore Naval Base. In March 1971, following the withdrawal from Singapore, and the return of 3 Commando Brigade to the UK, COMAFFEF was retitled Commodore Amphibious Warfare (COMAW), and moved to Fort Southwick, just outside Portsmouth. COMAW became subordinate to Flag Officer, Carriers and Amphibious Ships (FOCAF).

After 1979 when FOCAF became Flag Officer, Third Flotilla, COMAW became part of Third Flotilla. In 1981, Commodore Michael Clapp moved COMAW to Stonehouse Barracks in order to be based alongside HQ 3 Commando Brigade again. Following the pivotal role of the Royal Navy's amphibious forces during the Falklands War, when Clapp directed the Amphibious Group of the British task force, alongside Brigadier Julian Thompson, this co-location of the two Headquarters has endured ever since.

From 1992 COMAW reported to the two-star deployable battlestaff commander, currently titled Commander UK Strike Force. The reestablishment of the Amphibious Warfare Warfare Squadron was announced in March 1997. But the commander's title was renamed from COMAW to Commander Amphibious Task Group (COMATG) on 1 December 1997; subsequent references to a 'squadron' are hard to find. 

In the early 21st century COMATG deployments included Operation Veritas in 2001; Operation Telic, the 2003 invasion of Iraq; Operation Vela in 2006; Operation Highbrow, evacuating personnel from Lebanon in 2006; leading Combined Task Force 152 in the Middle East in 2008; and Operation Taurus in 2009.

Until 2011, COMATG was one of the deployable maritime commanders who with their headquarters reported to the Fleet Battle Staff, alongside two others, the Commander United Kingdom Carrier Strike Group (COMCSG) and the Commander UK Task Group (COMUKTG).  However, following the Strategic Defence and Security Review 2010, COMCSG and COMUKTG were abolished as separate commands and COMATG became the sole deployable HQ, under the new title of COMUKTG, responsible for command of the Response Force Task Group.  At this point, the former Commander UK Task Group became Deputy Commander United Kingdom Maritime Forces.

In early October 2012, the Commander UK Task Group, Commodore Paddy McAlpine led the Cougar 12 deployment of six ships and more than 3,000 marines and sailors to the Mediterranean Sea. One of the principle purposes of the deployment was to conduct large-scale amphibious exercises with allies. Key exercises included: 'Corsican Lion' with France; 'Albanian Lion' with Albania; a visit to Malta and exercises with the United States Navy and the Algerian Armed Forces.

McAlpine said: "Cougar 12 provides us with a superb opportunity to rekindle our amphibious capability after a prolonged period when our focus has been ..elsewhere." Exercise 'Corsican Lion' was the main focus of Cougar 12 and was designed to develop the maritime and amphibious components of the Anglo-French Combined Joint Expeditionary Force.

Brigadier Martin Smith of 3 Commando Brigade was quoted saying: "It is an incredibly versatile force and our burgeoning interoperability with the French further proves this. The quality of Royal Marines Commandos and French Marines delivers a highly effective first response capability ..optimised for early entry operations."

In March 2015, the post of COMUKTG reverted to its previous title of COMATG. COMATG was responsible to Commander United Kingdom Maritime Forces.

COMATG was re-titled Commander Littoral Strike Group on 1 October 2019, to reflect the expected increased size and capabilities of the group, including Queen Elizabeth-class aircraft carriers.

Deployments and operations
 COUGAR 11
 Op ELLAMY 11
 COUGAR 12
 Op PATWIN 13
 COUGAR 13
 COUGAR 14
 COUGAR 15
 Op WEALD 15
 JEF(M) 16
 CTF50 17
 Amphibious Task Group 18
 SAIF SAREEA 3 18
 BALTIC PROTECTOR 19
 Op SENTINEL 20 (International Maritime Security Construct)
 Littoral Response Group (Experimentation) Deployment 20

In command
Included:

Commodore, Amphibious Warfare
Commodore Hardress L. Lloyd: May 1965-May 1966
Commodore David Dunbar-Naismith DSC: May 1966-July 1967
Commodore Gerard Mansfield: July 1967-November 1968
Commodore Thomas W. Stocker: November 1968-September 1970
Commodore Derek W. Napper DSC: September 1970-August 1971
Commodore Roy W. Halliday DSC: August 1971-September 1973
Commodore David T. Smith: September 1973-October 1975 
Commodore Richard D. Franklin: October 1975-February 1977 
Commodore Derek R. Reffell: June 1978-October 1979 
Commodore Christopher J. Isacke: October 1979-May 1981 
Commodore Michael Clapp CB: May 1981-February 1983 
Commodore Peter G. V. Dingemans DSO: February 1983-January 1985 
Commodore John Garnier CBE LVO: January–July 1985 
Commodore E.S. Jeremy Larken DSO: July 1985-December 1987 
Commodore Brian W. Turner: December 1987-April 1990 
Commodore Peter J. Grindal: April 1990-April 1992 
Commodore Richard A.Y. Bridges: April 1992- July 1994 
Commodore Paul B.C. Canter CBE: July 1994-October 1996      
Commodore Paul D. Stone: October 1996-1 December 1997
Note: COMAW was renamed COMATG in 1997

Commander, Amphibious Task Group
Commodores in post included:
Commodore Paul D. Stone: 1 December 1997 – 1998 
Commodore Niall S.R. Kilgour: 1998-July 2001 
Commodore A. James G. Miller: July 2001-September 2003 
Commodore Christopher J. Parry: September 2003-January 2005 
Commodore George M. Zambellas: January 2005-August 2006 
Commodore Philip A. Jones: August 2006 – 2008 
Commodore Peter D. Hudson: 2008-May 2009 
Commodore Paul M. Bennett: May 2009-January 2011
Note: Following SDSR10, COMATG was renamed COMUKTG, and the Amphibious Task Group was renamed the Response Force Task Group.

Commander, U.K. Task Group
Commodores in post included:
Commodore John M. L. Kingwell: January–November 2011 
Commodore Patrick A. McAlpine: November 2011-February 2014 
Commodore Jeremy P. Kyd: February 2014-February 2015 
Commodore Martin J. Connell: February 2015-March 2015
Note: COMUKTG post reverted to the name Commander Amphibious Task Group in March 2015, and Cdre Connell continued in that role till May 2016

Commander, Amphibious Task Group
Commodores in post included:
Commodore Martin J. Connell: March 2015-May 2016 
Commodore Andrew P. Burns: May 2016-May 2018 
Commodore James M.B. Parkin: May 2018-October 2019
Note: COMATG was renamed Commander Littoral Strike Group in October 2019, and Cdre Parkin continued in post under the new title.

Commander, Littoral Strike Group
Commodore James M.B. Parkin: October 2019-May 2020
Commodore Robert G. Pedre: May 2020 – September 2022

Notes

References 
 Original edition may have been Leo Cooper/Orion, 1996.
Keleny, Anne (2016). "Rear-Admiral Peter Dingemans: Falklands War naval officer". The Independent. London, England: Newspaper Publishing PLC.
Mackie, Colin. (2018) "Royal Navy Senior Appointments from 1865" (PDF). gulabin.com. Colin Mackie. Scotland, UK.

Lit
Amphibious units and formations
Military units and formations established in 2019